Asthena nymphaeata is a moth in the family Geometridae first described by Otto Staudinger in 1897. It is found in the Russian Far East, Korea Japan and China.

References

Moths described in 1897
Asthena
Moths of Asia